The Catamarca Popular Movement is a provincial political party from the Argentine Province of Catamarca, founded in 1971 by the Ob/Gyn physician Ignacio Joaquín Avalos (1933-2007). From his extensive knowledge of his province and its inhabitants gathered after many years of medical practice and soccer playing, he developed a need to do something for the people and awareness about the problems of the region, that led him to create this independent political party. He was elected to become a member of the low chamber of the Argentinian National Congress for the period 1985-1989, due to an alliance with the Union Cívica Radical.  He was  candidate for vicegovernor of Catamarca in the elections of 1987.

It was member of the national Recrear electoral alliance led by Ricardo López Murphy. 

Provincial political parties in Argentina
Catamarca Province